Zulema del Carmen Jattin Corrales (born 31 July 1969) is a politician, and former Senator of Colombia and Chamber Representative for the Department of Córdoba.

Career
She was elected Councilwoman for Santa Cruz de Lorica from 1990 to 1992, and went on to become the heiress to her father's political career, in 1998 when she was elected to the Chamber of Representatives of Colombia for the Liberal Party. Her father Francisco José Jattin Safar, had been a Chamber Representative from 1990 to 1996 when he lost his investiture for being linked in the Proceso 8000.

In 2004 she was elected President of the Chamber of Representatives of Colombia beating her closest rival William Vélez Mesa, Representative for Antioquia. On 20 July she succeeded Alonso Acosta Osio in the Chamber, at the same time when across Congress, her ex-husband Luis Humberto Gómez Gallo, was taking office as President of the Senate. In 2006 she successfully ran for Senate.

Parapolitics scandal

In 2008 the Supreme Court of Colombia ran preliminary investigations into Jattin for links to Salvatore Mancuso and Rodrigo Tovar Pupo alias "Jorge 40", both paramilitary chiefs and drug traffickers extradited to the United States but could not find conclusive evidence to charge her for anything.

On 11 May 2009 the Supreme Court issued a warrant for her arrest for links with paramilitarism. During her arrest, her father Francisco José Jattin, suffered a heart attack and died four days later in a hospital. Because the Supreme Court investigates all charged members of congress, Jattin renounced her seat in Congress on 13 May 2009, thus transferring the process from the Supreme Court to the Office of the Attorney General of Colombia, however the Supreme Court later ruled that all cases pertaining to congresspersons and linked by parapolitics would be prosecuted by the Supreme Court whether they had renounced their seat or not. She was replaced in Congress by Jairo Mantilla Colmenares.

Because of the death of her father she was allowed to attend to his funeral in Lorica with a permit from the INPEC, the defence was also granted house arrest for Jattin as she was the primary caretaker of her infant child, but she was freed seven months later after the statute of limitations had run out because the prosecution had not formally charged her after detaining her within the set time by the law. In September 2010, she was called in for questioning by the Court for calumny and slander for statements made to the press when she was arrested; she accused the Court and its members of kidnapping, and persecution among other things, she later recanted her statement, but the court choose to continue with their charge.

Electoral history

Personal life
Zulema del Carmen was born on 31 July 1969 in Lorica, Cordobá to Francisco José Jattin Safar and Ema Corrales. She married on 22 June 2002 to Luis Humberto Gómez Gallo but divorced in 2003; together they had one daughter Zulema María.

References

1969 births
Living people
People from Córdoba Department
Colombian people of Lebanese descent
Complutense University of Madrid alumni
Members of the Chamber of Representatives of Colombia
Presidents of the Chamber of Representatives of Colombia
Members of the Senate of Colombia
Kidnapped Colombian people
Colombian parapolitics scandal
Colombian Liberal Party politicians